The 1925 Ohio Wesleyan Battling Bishops football team was an American football team that represented Ohio Wesleyan University as a member of the Ohio Athletic Conference (OAC) during the 1925 college football season. In its fifth season under head coach George Gauthier, the team compiled a 7–1–1 record (6–0 against OAC opponents), won the OAC championship, shut out six of nine opponents, and outscored all opponents by a combined score of 219 to 25.

The team was undefeated in games against OAC opponents, sustaining its only loss by a single touchdown to Ohio State and playing Syracuse to a 3–3 tie. The team played its home games at Edwards Field in Delaware, Ohio.

Schedule

References

Ohio Wesleyan
Ohio Wesleyan Battling Bishops football seasons
Ohio Wesleyan Battling Bishops football